Mirabilis multiflora is a species of flowering plant in the four o'clock family known by the common name Colorado four o'clock that is native to the southwestern United States from California to Colorado and Texas, as well as far northern Mexico, where it grows in mostly dry habitat types in a number of regions.

Description
The leaves are oppositely arranged on the spreading stem branches. The flowers occur in leaf axils on the upper branches. Usually six flowers bloom in a bell-shaped involucre of five partly fused bracts.

Uses
Among the Zuni people, the powdered root mixed with flour, made into a bread and used to decrease appetite. An infusion of the root is taken and rubbed on the abdomen of hungry adults and children. An infusion of the powdered root is taken by adults or children after overeating.

Pollination 
M. multiflora'''s reproduction is dependent on hawkmoths for pollination. Two primary pollinators are the hawkmoths Hyles lineata and Manduca quinquemaculata.''

References

External links
Jepson Manual Treatment
Photo gallery

multiflora
Flora of the Southwestern United States
Night-blooming plants
Plants used in traditional Native American medicine
Taxa named by Asa Gray
Taxa named by John Torrey